Sussat is a commune in the Allier department in Auvergne-Rhône-Alpes in central France.

The romanesque church of Saint Bonnet was, in the Middle Ages, under the patronage of the powerful Benedictine abbey of Menat.

Population

See also
Communes of the Allier department

References

Communes of Allier